Tommaso Marra (born January 20, 1977 in Rome, Italy), best known as Tommyknocker, is a Hardcore producer and DJ.

Career

In 1992, Tommyknocker bought his first set of turntables. Two years later, he discovered hardcore music. When he was captivated by that genre, he entered the underground rave scene by spinning at illegal raves in Rome, and at parties with an atmosphere and sound that very much influenced Tommyknocker as an artist.

The name Tommyknocker appeared for the first time on a flyer in 1995 when Tommyknocker started spinning for Freddy K at clubs and on the radio. He was one of the first DJs to play hardcore in Italian clubs. He became a resident DJ at the Oxygen parties, where he came in contact with Hardcore artists from other countries, specifically the Netherlands, thereby broadening his musical horizons.

In the following years, Tommyknocker continued playing hardcore in Rome, and by 1998, he decided to begin producing music. Tommyknocker was inspired by artists such as Promo, Stunned Guys, PCP, Miro, and Lory D. By 1999, Tommyknocker had released his first EP "The Realm" on Traxtorm Records.

Over the next few years, without having achieved a critical breakthrough hit, Tommyknocker released his hit EP Showtime in 2003, featuring Demolition and Showtime. This release exemplifies why he has gained a reputation in the hardcore scene as a DJ who heavily favors distorted bass and angry vocals. After this release, Tommyknocker moved to Belgium to keep up with incoming bookings in Western Europe. Since then, he has regularly played at major Hardcore events such as Masters of Hardcore, Decibel Outdoor, Raving Nightmare, Defqon.1 Festival, and Q-Base. In 2005, Tommyknocker performed in front of the biggest crowd he had ever played for at the famous Thunderdome festival. To this day, Tommyknocker plays for the crowds all over Europe, including Australia. His next release, "Twisted World", a collaboration done together with The Viper, hit the first position in the Masters Of Hardcore Radio Live top 100 in 2007. By 2009, Tommyknocker released the track "Criminal". The track is influenced by the 1990s hardcore techno, with a message about government corruption that resonated loudly with both fans and fellow producers. As a result, the track received second place in the Masters Of Hardcore Radio Live Top 100.

In 2010, Tommyknocker returned to Rome, where he now currently lives.

Discography

References

External links 
 Tommyknocker - Official Website
 

Hardcore techno musicians
Italian DJs
Musicians from Rome
Living people
1977 births
Electronic dance music DJs